Cytharomorula danigoi is a species of sea snail, a marine gastropod mollusk in the family Muricidae, the murex snails or rock snails.

Description
The length of the shell attains 11.6 mm0

Distribution
This marine species occurs off New Caledonia.

References

 Houart R. (1995["1994"]) The Ergalataxinae (Gastropoda, Muricidae) from the New Caledonia region with some comments on the subfamily and the description of thirteen new species from the Indo-West Pacific. Bulletin du Muséum National d'Histoire Naturelle, Paris, ser. 4, 16(A, 2-4): 245-297.

External links
 MNHN, Paris: holotype

Gastropods described in 1995
Cytharomorula